HaAyin HaShevi'it (lit. The Seventh Eye) is an Israeli Internet site that investigates and discusses the media field, especially mass media in Israel.

The printed version magazine was first published by the Israel Democracy Institute in 1996, initially once every two months. It delivered its final print issue, #70, in January 2008 and moved to online-only publication.

In April 2015, the newsroom departed from the Israel Democracy Institute. Today, the publisher is an independent NGO that was founded by the site's staff and some of the frequent contributing writers.

References 

Nati Tucker and Amir Teig, "The watchdogs' watchdog: 'Balanced' journalism is a recipe for corruption", Haaretz, 26 August 2014
Eytan Avriel, "How Israel profits from the nonprofits" Haaretz, 28 April 2015

External links
 
Selected articles in English
Reportings by The Seventh Eye in English, +972 Magazine

1996 establishments in Israel
Israeli news websites
Magazines about the media
Magazines established in 1996
News magazines published in Israel
Online magazines with defunct print editions